The Calvó-Armengol International Prize is awarded every two years by the Barcelona School of Economics in cooperation with the Government of Andorra to "a top researcher in economics or the social sciences younger than 40 years old for his or her contribution to the theory and comprehension of the mechanisms of social interaction." 

The prize was set up to honor the memory of Barcelona School of Economics Affiliated Professor and ICREA-UAB Professor Antoni Calvó-Armengol, a highly esteemed researcher from Andorra who died unexpectedly in November 2007 at the age of 37. The prize ceremony takes place in Andorra, and an associated "Calvó-Armengol Lecture" is delivered by the recipient in Barcelona. The prize includes a cash award of 30,000 euros.

Prize recipients
The Calvó Prize was awarded for the first time in 2010 to Esther Duflo from the Massachusetts Institute of Technology. In 2019, Duflo became the first recipient of the Calvó Prize to be awarded the Nobel Memorial Prize in Economic Sciences.

See also

 List of economics awards
 List of social sciences awards
 John Bates Clark Medal
 MacArthur Fellowship
 Nobel Memorial Prize in Economic Sciences

References

External links
Calvó-Armengol International Prize Web
Antoni Calvó-Armengol's Website
Remembering Toni: Gifted Researcher, Admired Teacher, and Irreplaceable Friend and Colleague

Economics awards
Catalan awards
Andorran awards